George Gray (May 4, 1840 – August 7, 1925) was a United States senator from Delaware and a United States circuit judge of the United States Court of Appeals for the Third Circuit and the United States Circuit Courts for the Third Circuit.

Education and career

Gray was born on May 4, 1840, in New Castle, New Castle County, Delaware, son of Andrew C. Gray (1804–1885), a lawyer, banker, businessman, and public official in the U.S. state of Delaware. The younger Gray attended the common schools, received an Artium Baccalaureus degree in 1859 from the College of New Jersey (now Princeton University), an Artium Magister degree in 1863 from the same institution, attended Harvard Law School, then read law with his father and was admitted to the bar in 1863. He entered private practice in New Castle from 1863 to 1879. He was the Attorney General of Delaware from 1879 to 1885.

Gray was a member of the Permanent Court of Arbitration at The Hague from 1900 to 1925.

Congressional service

Gray was elected as a Democrat to the United States Senate to fill the vacancy caused by the resignation of United States Senator Thomas F. Bayard. He was reelected in 1887 and 1893 and served from March 18, 1885, to March 3, 1899. He was an unsuccessful candidate for reelection in 1899. He was Chairman of the Committee on Patents for the 53rd United States Congress; Chairman of the Committee on Privileges and Elections for the 53rd United States Congress; and Chairman of the Committee on Revolutionary Claims for the 55th United States Congress.

Federal judicial service

On March 29, 1899, Gray received a recess appointment from President William McKinley to the United States Court of Appeals for the Third Circuit and the United States Circuit Courts for the Third Circuit, to a new joint seat authorized by 30 Stat. 846. He was nominated to the same position by  McKinley on December 11, 1899. He was confirmed by the United States Senate on December 18, 1899, and received his commission the same day. On December 31, 1911, the Circuit Courts were abolished and he thereafter served only on the Court of Appeals. His service ended when he retired on June 1, 1914.

Presidential consideration

Gray was proposed as a nominee for the Presidency at the 1904 and 1908 Democratic Conventions. In 1904, he received only 12 votes, and in 1908 he received 50.5 votes, finishing second behind William Jennings Bryan.

Other service

Gray was a member of the Joint High Commission which met in Quebec, Canada, in August 1898 to settle differences between the United States and Canada. He was a member of the commission to arrange the terms of the Treaty of Paris (1898) between the United States and Spain in 1898. He was Chairman of the commission to investigate conditions of the coal strike in Pennsylvania in 1902. He was appointed by President McKinley to the Permanent Court of Arbitration at The Hague, Netherlands in 1900. He was reappointed in 1906 by President Theodore Roosevelt, in 1912 by President William Howard Taft and in 1920 by President Woodrow Wilson. He was a member of several commissions established to arbitrate various international disputes. He was a member of the Board of Regents of the Smithsonian Institution from 1890 to 1925. He was Vice President and trustee of the Carnegie Endowment for International Peace.

Death

Gray died on August 7, 1925, in Wilmington, Delaware. He was interred in Presbyterian Cemetery in New Castle.

References

Sources

 Delaware's Members of Congress
 The Political Graveyard

External links

Delaware Historical Society; website; 505 North Market Street, Wilmington, Delaware 19801; (302) 655-7161
University of Delaware; Library website; 181 South College Avenue, Newark, Delaware 19717; (302) 831-2965

1840 births
1925 deaths
Princeton University alumni
People from Wilmington, Delaware
Delaware lawyers
Delaware Democrats
Delaware Attorneys General
Democratic Party United States senators from Delaware
Judges of the United States Court of Appeals for the Third Circuit
United States federal judges appointed by William McKinley
Candidates in the 1904 United States presidential election
Candidates in the 1908 United States presidential election
20th-century American politicians
Burials in New Castle County, Delaware
Members of the Permanent Court of Arbitration
Harvard Law School alumni
People from New Castle, Delaware
American judges of international courts and tribunals
People from New Castle County, Delaware